Fajardo River is a river of Fajardo, Puerto Rico. It crosses Ceiba and Fajardo. It is 16.35 miles long.

It is a scenic river with pools, rapids, an extensive tropical forest.

Gallery

See also
List of rivers of Puerto Rico

References

External links
 USGS Hydrologic Unit Map – Caribbean Region (1974)

Rivers of Puerto Rico